Events from the year 1649 in Sweden

Incumbents
 Monarch – Christina

Events

 René Descartes arrives in Sweden. 
 Swedish Africa Company is founded. 
 A new school regulation is created.
 The public net of transportation is re-organised.
 Långholmens spinnhus is founded.

Births

 Christina Eleonora Drakenhielm, convert (died 1712) 
 Magdalena Stenbock, politically active countess and salon holder (died 1727)

Deaths

 Constantia Eriksdotter, illegitimate daughter of Eric XIV of Sweden and Agda Persdotter (born 1560)

References

 
Years of the 17th century in Sweden
Sweden